Fifty Fathoms Deep (French title: Mon ami Tim) is a 1932 French drama film directed by Jack Forrester and starring Jeanne Helbling, Thomy Bourdelle and Frank O'Neill.

Cast
 Jeanne Helbling as Myra Maden  
 Thomy Bourdelle as Tim Burke  
 Frank O'Neill as Pinky Lawrence  
 Grazia del Rio as Une amie  
 Raymond Dandy as Un passant 
 Dahlia 
 Jean Gaubens 
 Clara Lee 
 Raymond Narlay

References

Bibliography 
 Crisp, Colin. Genre, Myth and Convention in the French Cinema, 1929-1939. Indiana University Press, 2002.

External links 
 

1932 films
1932 drama films
French drama films
1930s French-language films
French black-and-white films
1930s French films